The following species in the flowering plant genus Linum, the flaxes, are accepted by Plants of the World Online. There has been no review of Linum taxonomy since 1931.

Linum acuticarpum 
Linum adenophyllum 
Linum adustum 
Linum aethiopicum 
Linum africanum 
Linum aksehirense 
Linum alatum 
Linum albidum 
Linum album 
Linum allredii 
Linum alpinum 
Linum altaicum 
Linum amurense 
Linum anglicum 
Linum appressum 
Linum arboreum 
Linum arenicola 
Linum aretioides 
Linum aristatum 
Linum aroanium 
Linum australe 
Linum austriacum 
Linum ayliniae 
Linum bahamense 
Linum baicalense 
Linum basarabicum 
Linum berlandieri 
Linum betsiliense 
Linum bicarpellatum 
Linum bienne 
Linum boissieri 
Linum brachypetalum 
Linum brevifolium 
Linum brevistylum 
Linum breweri 
Linum burkartii 
Linum caespitosum 
Linum californicum 
Linum campanulatum 
Linum capitatum 
Linum cariense 
Linum carneum 
Linum carnosulum 
Linum carratracense 
Linum carteri 
Linum catharticum 
Linum chaborasicum 
Linum chamissonis 
Linum ciliatum 
Linum clevelandii 
Linum compactum 
Linum comptonii 
Linum congestum 
Linum corymbiferum 
Linum corymbulosum 
Linum cratericola 
Linum cremnophilum 
Linum cruciatum 
Linum cubense 
Linum czernjajevii 
Linum decumbens 
Linum densiflorum 
Linum digynum 
Linum doerfleri 
Linum dolomiticum 
Linum drymarioides 
Linum elegans 
Linum elongatum 
Linum emirnense 
Linum empetrifolium 
Linum erigeroides 
Linum ertugrulii 
Linum esterhuyseniae 
Linum euboeum 
Linum extraaxillare 
Linum filiforme 
Linum flagellare 
Linum flavum 
Linum floridanum 
Linum flos-carmini 
Linum gaditanum 
Linum goulimyi 
Linum gracile 
Linum grandiflorum 
Linum guatemalense 
Linum gyaricum 
Linum gypsogenium 
Linum harlingii 
Linum harperi 
Linum hellenicum 
Linum heterosepalum 
Linum heterostylum 
Linum hirsutum 
Linum hologynum 
Linum hudsonioides 
Linum hypericifolium 
Linum imbricatum 
Linum intercursum 
Linum iranicum 
Linum jimenezii 
Linum katiae 
Linum kaynakiae 
Linum keniense 
Linum khorassanicum 
Linum kingii 
Linum komarovii 
Linum kurdicum 
Linum lasiocarpum 
Linum leonii 
Linum leucanthum 
Linum lewisii 
Linum littorale 
Linum longipes 
Linum lundellii 
Linum macraei 
Linum macrocarpum 
Linum macrorhizum 
Linum marginale 
Linum marianorum 
Linum maritimum 
Linum marojejyense 
Linum mauritanicum 
Linum mcvaughii 
Linum medium 
Linum meletonis 
Linum mexicanum 
Linum micranthum 
Linum modestum 
Linum monogynum 
Linum mucronatum 
Linum mysorense 
Linum narbonense 
Linum nelsonii 
Linum neomexicanum 
Linum nervosum 
Linum nodiflorum 
Linum numidicum 
Linum obtusatum 
Linum olgae 
Linum oligophyllum 
Linum olympicum 
Linum orizabae 
Linum pallasianum 
Linum pallescens 
Linum pamphylicum 
Linum perenne 
Linum persicum 
Linum peyronii 
Linum phitosianum 
Linum platyphyllum 
Linum polygaloides 
Linum pratense 
Linum pringlei 
Linum prostratum 
Linum puberulum 
Linum pubescens 
Linum punctatum 
Linum pungens 
Linum quadrifolium 
Linum ramosissimum 
Linum rigidum 
Linum rupestre 
Linum rzedowskii 
Linum salsoloides 
Linum scabrellum 
Linum schiedeanum 
Linum scoparium 
Linum selaginoides 
Linum seljukorum 
Linum setaceum 
Linum silpii 
Linum smithii 
Linum spergulinum 
Linum squamulosum 
Linum squarrosum 
Linum stelleroides 
Linum stocksianum 
Linum striatum 
Linum strictum 
Linum subbiflorum 
Linum subteres 
Linum suffruticosum 
Linum sulcatum 
Linum tauricum 
Linum tegedense 
Linum tenellum 
Linum tenue 
Linum tenuifolium 
Linum thesioides 
Linum thracicum 
Linum thunbergii 
Linum tmoleum 
Linum toxicum 
Linum triflorum 
Linum trigynum 
Linum turcomanicum 
Linum ucranicum 
Linum unguiculatum 
Linum uninerve 
Linum usitatissimum 
Linum vanense 
Linum velutinum 
Linum vernale 
Linum verruciferum 
Linum villarianum 
Linum villosum 
Linum violascens 
Linum virginianum 
Linum virgultorum 
Linum viscosum 
Linum volkensii 
Linum vuralianum 
Linum westii

References

Linum